Galactose-3-O-sulfotransferase 4 is an enzyme that in humans is encoded by the GAL3ST4 gene.

This gene encodes a member of the galactose-3-O-sulfotransferase protein family. The product of this gene catalyzes sulfonation by transferring a sulfate to the C-3' position of galactose residues in O-linked glycoproteins. This enzyme is highly specific for core 1 structures, with asialofetuin, Gal-beta-1,3-GalNAc and Gal-beta-1,3 (GlcNAc-beta-1,6)GalNAc being good substrates.

Mutations

Pectus Excavatum, the most common deformity of the chest wall, is believed to have a genetic component. The condition is believed to be passed either dominantly or recessively by a gene of unknown identity. A study performed in 2012 by Wu et al. states that pectus excavatum displays dominant inheritance via a mutation in GAL3ST4. The study proposes mutation g.chr7: 99764688G>A affects the first exon of GAL3ST4 resulting in tryptophan replacing arginine at residue 11 of the encoded protein. This mutation is highly likely to disrupt the normal function of the encoded protein. GAL3ST4 is typically responsible for catalyzing “the C-3 sulfation of galactoses in O-linked glycoproteins”. Mutation of this gene results in alterations of the typical sulfation pattern of glycan chains, which will alter the physiologic functions of various glycoproteins. For normal development of cartilage and bone to occur, sulfation of proteoglycans must occur. Mutations of proteins responsible for other aspects of sulfation and sulfatases have been linked to several mutations affecting the skeleton. Through the evaluation of several participants with pectus excavatum, Wu et al. determined mutation of GAL3ST4 is most likely responsible for the dominant inheritance pattern of pectus excavatum through alterations of the encoded proteins.

References

Further reading